Perimyositis is inflammation or swelling of tissues near the muscles.

See also
 myopathy (muscle disease)
 myalgia (muscle pain)
 Masticatory muscle myositis (a disease in dogs)
 myositis

References

Inflammations
Muscular disorders